The Mustești is a left tributary of the river Crișul Alb in Romania. It discharges into the Crișul Alb in Bonțești.

References

Rivers of Romania
Rivers of Arad County